Martín Naidich (born 17 December 1990) is an Argentine swimmer. He competed in the men's 400 metre freestyle event at the 2016 Summer Olympics.

References

External links
 

1990 births
Living people
Argentine male swimmers
Olympic swimmers of Argentina
Swimmers at the 2016 Summer Olympics
South American Games gold medalists for Argentina
South American Games medalists in swimming
Swimmers from Buenos Aires
Competitors at the 2014 South American Games
Argentine male freestyle swimmers
21st-century Argentine people